The 1982 UEFA European Under-16 Championship was the first  UEFA European Under-17 Championship. Italy was the host of the championship. The tournament took place from  5 to 7 May 1982. Four teams entered the competition, after playing one qualifying stage and quarterfinals.

Italy won the final against West Germany.

Qualifying

The final tournament of the 1982 UEFA European Under-16 Championship was preceded by two qualification stages: a qualifying round and quarterfinals. During these rounds, 26 national teams competed to determine the four teams that played the tournament.

Participants

Results

Semi-finals

Third place match

Final

References
UEFA.com
RSSSF.com

 
1982
UEFA
UEFA
1982
UEFA European Under-16 Championship
UEFA European Under-16 Championship